Hiyoshi Bosai Dam is an earthfill dam located in Gifu Prefecture in Japan. The dam is used for flood control. The catchment area of the dam is 2.3 km2. The dam impounds about 5  ha of land when full and can store 317 thousand cubic meters of water. The construction of the dam was started on 1972 and completed in 1976.

References

Dams in Gifu Prefecture
1976 establishments in Japan